The 1954–55 NBA season was the Hawks' sixth season in the NBA and the fourth and final season in Milwaukee.

There would not be another NBA franchise in Milwaukee, until the Bucks began play in 1968.

Regular season

Season standings

x – clinched playoff spot

Record vs. opponents

Game log

Awards and records
Bob Pettit, NBA Rookie of the Year Award
Bob Pettit, All-NBA First Team

References

Atlanta Hawks seasons
Milwaukee
Milwaukee Hawks
Milwaukee Hawks